Robert Hardy Ledger (5 October 1937 – 14 September 2015) was an English professional footballer born in Chester-le-Street, County Durham. He played as a midfielder during the 1950s, 1960s and 1970s. He was defense, midfield and forward for Oldham Athletic and went in goals when goalkeeper Dave Best was injured.

Ledger died on 14 September 2015 at his home in Doncaster, following a short illness. He was 77.

References

1937 births
2015 deaths
Sportspeople from Chester-le-Street
Footballers from County Durham
English footballers
Association football midfielders
English Football League players
Huddersfield Town A.F.C. players
Oldham Athletic A.F.C. players
Mansfield Town F.C. players
Barrow A.F.C. players